Pablo Alejandro Bolados Valenzuela (born 8 December 1978) is a Chilean former footballer who played as a midfielder.

He played for clubs like Deportes La Serena or Deportes Copiapó.

References
 

Living people
1978 births
Chilean footballers
Association football midfielders
C.D. Arturo Fernández Vial footballers
Puerto Montt footballers
Ñublense footballers
Cobreloa footballers
Curicó Unido footballers
Deportes Copiapó footballers
San Luis de Quillota footballers
Deportes La Serena footballers
Chilean Primera División players
Primera B de Chile players
Segunda División Profesional de Chile players